Olive Green is an unincorporated community in Delaware County, in the U.S. state of Ohio.

History
Olive Green was laid out in 1835. A post office called Olive Green was established in 1845, and remained in operation until 1851. Olive Green later used the Kingston Center post office.

Nearby is the Chambers Road Covered Bridge, a historic site built in 1874.

References

Unincorporated communities in Delaware County, Ohio
Unincorporated communities in Ohio